The Assiniboine Park Pavilion is a landmark building at Assiniboine Park in Winnipeg, Manitoba, Canada. It is today one of Winnipeg's most familiar landmarks. 

Among other things, the building houses the Pavilion Gallery Museum, a museum and art gallery that opened in 1998.

History 
The current Pavilion is the second pavilion building built in the park. The original Assiniboine Park Pavilion was built in 1908 and opened before the park itself. Designed by John D. Atchison, that structure followed the early prairie style of architect Frank Lloyd Wright. Constructed at a cost of CA$19,000 and intended for summer use only, the building included a dance hall, banquet hall, and lunch and catering facilities; as well as a  tower that held a  water tank whose water was drawn from the nearby Assiniboine River and supplied the park's water system. This original Pavilion building, having suffered from previous structural issues as well, was ultimately destroyed by a fire in May 1929.

The current, larger pavilion, designed by architectural firm Northwood & Chivers, was opened on 24 May 1930. 

Following the 1930 reconstruction, the Pavilion’s main floor held a canteen and kitchens, while the second floor held a restaurant, dining room, and a 500-person dance hall. Eventually, the restaurant was closed and the Pavilion fell into disuse. In 1969, the refreshment facilities on the main floor were renovated, with space added to house a souvenir shop and a park museum.

After a large-scale renovation in 1998, the Pavilion Gallery Museum was opened in the building alongside a restaurant called Tavern in the Park. Tavern in the Park closed in 2008 and was replaced by Terrace Fifty-Five in December of that year.

Pavilion Gallery Museum 
The Pavilion Gallery Museum, opened in 1998, is a museum and art gallery located within the Assiniboine Park Pavilion.

The gallery houses the largest collections of works by three internationally-renowned Manitoba artists—Ivan Eyre, Clarence Tillenius and Walter J. Phillips—while the second floor area is dedicated to the work of emerging Manitoba artists.

The museum is affiliated with the CMA, the CHIN, and the Virtual Museum of Canada.

References

External links
 

Museums in Winnipeg
Art museums and galleries in Manitoba
Art museums established in 1998
1998 establishments in Manitoba
Tuxedo, Winnipeg